The Western Addition is a district in San Francisco, California, United States.

Location
The Western Addition is located between Van Ness Avenue, the Richmond District, the Haight-Ashbury and Lower Haight neighborhoods, and Pacific Heights.

Today, the term Western Addition is generally used in two ways: to denote either the development's original geographic area or the eastern portion of the neighborhood (also called the Fillmore District) that was redeveloped in the 1950s.

Those who use the term in the former sense generally consider its boundaries to be Van Ness Avenue on the east, Masonic on the west, California Street on the north, and Fell or Oak Street on the south. From there, it is usually divided into smaller neighborhoods such as Lower Pacific Heights, Cathedral Hill, Japantown, the Fillmore, Hayes Valley, Alamo Square, Anza Vista, and North Panhandle.

The San Francisco Association of Realtors defines the term more closely to the latter sense, treating it as "District 6D" (not to be confused with Board of Supervisors districts; much of the Western Addition is in supervisors District 5), bounded by Geary Boulevard in the north, McAllister and Fulton streets, and Golden Gate Avenue on the south, Van Ness Avenue in the east, and Divisadero Street on the west. By this definition, the Western Addition is roughly synonymous with the Fillmore and Cathedral Hill neighborhoods.

History 
Historically, the Western Addition was first platted during the 1850s as a result of the Van Ness Ordinance. This large tract encompassed some 500 blocks running west from Larkin Street (the city's previous western boundary) to Divisadero Street, (hence the name "Western Addition") creating Jefferson Square, Hamilton Square, Alamo Square, Alta Plaza, and Lafayette Square. The area was initially used for small-scale farming; but, following the invention of the cable car during the 1870s, the Western Addition developed as a Victorian streetcar suburb. It survived the 1906 San Francisco earthquake with its Victorian-style buildings largely intact.

After the Second World War, the Western Addition — particularly the Fillmore District — became a population base and a cultural center for San Francisco's African-American community, a consequence of opportune housing supply due to the internment of Japanese Americans. Since then, urban renewal schemes and San Francisco's changing demographics have led to major changes in the economic and ethnic makeup of the neighborhood, as the Fillmore District suffered from crime and poverty while many other districts underwent significant gentrification. The Central Freeway used to run through the neighborhood to Turk Street, but that section of the freeway was closed immediately after the 1989 Loma Prieta earthquake and later demolished.

Since the early 1990s, the Western Addition has undergone significant gentrification.

Government and infrastructure
The San Francisco Police Department Northern Station serves the Western Addition.

Notable buildings 

 Goodman Building, 1117 Geary Blvd. Built around 1860, residential hotel and commercial building, formerly an artists coop building.
 Stadtmuller House, 819 Eddy Street. Built in 1880, a highly decorated house featuring late 19th-century Italianate architecture; listed as a San Francisco Designated Landmark, a California Historical Landmark, and a National Register of Historic Places listed place.

See also
Bethel African Methodist Episcopal Church (San Francisco, California)
Fillmore District

References

External links

  

 
Neighborhoods in San Francisco